The 2018 Campeonato Paraibano de Futebol was the 108th edition of Paraíba's top professional football league. The competition began on 7 January and ended on 8 April. Botafogo-PB were defending champions, after defeating Treze in the 2017 final.

Format
The competition was divided into a number of stages.

In the first (group) stage, the ten teams weredivided into two groups of five. Each team played the five teams in the other group, home and away, for a total of ten games. The teams that finished top of each group qualified directly for the third (semi-final) stage. The teams that finished second and third in each group qualified for the second (quarter-final) stage. Of these two teams, the one with the best record in the competition was classified first for going into the next stage. The teams that finished fourth and fifth in each group played in the relegation quadrangle stage.

In the second (quarter-final) stage, the teams that finished second in each group played the team finishing third in the same group over two legs, home and away. In both ties the team that finished third in their group played the first leg at home. The two winning teams qualified for the third (semi-final) stage. The team with the best record in the competition so far was classified as third going into that stage.

In the relegation quadrangle stage, the four qualifying teams played each other home and away, with no points carried forward from the first (group) stage. The two teams that finished bottom of this stage were relegated to Division 2 for 2019.

In the third (semi-final) stage, the team classified fourth played the team classified first, and the team classified third played the team classified second. Both ties were played over two legs, with the lower qualified team playing the first leg at home.

In the final stage, the two winning teams from the third (semi-final) stage played over two legs, with the team with the best record in the competition so far playing the first leg away from home.

Qualification
The two finalists qualified to participate in the 2019 Copa do Brasil and 2019 Copa do Nordeste. The two best placed teams (other than Botafogo-PB) qualified to participate in the 2019 Campeonato Brasileiro Série D.

Participating teams

First stage

Group A

Group B

Quarter-final stage
Games were played between 7 and 15 March.

|}

Semi-final stage
Games were scheduled to be played on 18 March and 25 March. The first leg between Botafogo-PB and Treze was postponed due to a legal challenge by Botafogo-PB regarding who should have home advantage according to the published rules of the competition. Following rejection of the challenge, the game was rescheduled for 25 March, with the second leg on 1 April.

|}

Final stage
Games were played on 5 and 8 April.

|}

Relegation quadrangle
Games took place between 7 and 25 March.

References

Paraíba
2018